The Great Raft was a gigantic log jam or series of "rafts" that clogged the Red and Atchafalaya rivers and was unique in North America in terms of its scale.

Origin
The Great Raft probably began forming in the 12th century. It grew from its upper end, while decaying or washing out at the lower end.

Because of its scale, the Great Raft became incorporated in the mythology of the regional Caddo tribe, which had been in the area for thousands of years. They credited it with protecting them from competing tribes, as well as intermittently causing floods on the land and making it fertile for agriculture.

Harrelson et al. describe the origins of the raft:
This ecosystem of entangled logs, vegetation and sediments remained in place for almost two millennia, altering the flow regime of the Red River and causing a complete change in its geomorphic character from a single channel to a series of anastomosing channels. It is believed that the initial formation of the Great Raft was triggered by catastrophic flooding as the Red River was going through some major geomorphic threshold, such as a major avulsion. The main contributors to the development of the Great Raft are believed to be the shifting geomorphic conditions in conjunction with extensive precipitation, river bank rotational slips and slab failure, rapid lateral migration, copious, rapidly growing riparian vegetation, exceeding a geomorphic threshold, a flashy hydrograph and a very heavy sediment load.

Characteristics
At the beginning of the 19th century, the raft extended from Campti, Louisiana, to around Shreveport, Louisiana. The raft blocked the mouth of Twelve Mile Bayou, impeding settlement in the area west of Shreveport. There were many smaller logjams on the Red River.

The raft raised the banks of the river, creating bayous and several lakes. Called the Great Raft Lakes, these included Caddo and Cross Lakes, along the lower reaches of the Red River's tributaries. Ports developed along these lakes, and Jefferson, Texas, on Caddo Lake became the second-largest inland port in the United States during this period. The city thrived and was considered a major gateway to East Texas. It was important for shipping out area commodity crops, such as cotton.

Removal

In the 1830s, steamboat builder and river captain Henry Miller Shreve (1785–1851), Superintendent of Western River Improvement in 1829 "was hired the US Army Corps of Engineers to remove the Great Raft to improve navigation on the Red River". Harrelson et al. describes this efforts:
Captain Shreve was a steamboat entrepreneur who had successfully invested in the new steam-power technology by developing the snag boat, a steam-powered boat used for raft removal. He had already used this technology to clear navigational paths in the Ohio and Mississippi rivers in 1827. Captain Shreve arrived at the toe of the Great Raft in April 1833 with four snag boats and a force of 159 men. His group began clearing a navigational path through 115 km of the Great Raft and, finally, by the spring of 1838, a path had been cleared; however, the remnants of the Great Raft along the river banks were not cleared and the Great Raft immediately began to reform

When Shreve began work, the raft blocked a distance from  directly below to  directly above Shreveport. By April 1835, Shreve had removed the raft up to the mouth of Twelvemile Bayou. He concluded this work in 1838, having removed the last impediment to navigation on the Red River. This task was continued by others until the latter part of the 19th century. For his efforts, the city of Shreveport was named after him.

Second Great Raft
Although Shreve had completely removed the original raft, another soon formed farther up the river. The new foot was at the head of the old raft, near today's Belcher, Louisiana. This second raft gradually extended until it reached the Arkansas state line. This was removed in 1873 by Lieutenant Eugene Woodruff.

Consequences
When the log jams were removed, the water level in Caddo Lake and others dropped dramatically, reducing their navigability for riverboats. The ports declined, and riverboats ceased to travel in Caddo Lake.

The removal of the massive log jams hastened the capture of the Mississippi River's waters in lower Louisiana by the Atchafalaya River, a major distributary emptying separately into the Gulf of Mexico.  In the 20th century, to maintain the Mississippi, the US Army Corps of Engineers built the multibillion-dollar Old River Control Structure.

See also
Caddo Lake

References

Further reading

 Tyson, Carl N. The Red River in Southwestern History. Norman: University of Oklahoma Press, 1981. 
 The Attack on the Great Raft by Edith S. McCall, author of Conquering the Rivers: Henry Miller Shreve and the Navigation of America’s Inland Waterways (Louisiana State University, 1984). 
 Great Raft, Parish of Caddo, 2004.
 The Great Raft. From  Discovering Lewis & Clark , with an undated photograph courtesy Noel Memorial Library Archives, Louisiana State University, Shreveport, and another by photographer R. B. Talfour in 1873.

History of Louisiana
Natural history of Texas
History of Shreveport, Louisiana
Rafts
Red River of the South
1838 disestablishments in the United States
Floating islands